Prima ballerina assoluta is a title awarded to the most notable of female ballet dancers. To be recognised as a prima ballerina assoluta is a rare honour, traditionally reserved only for the most exceptional dancers of their generation. Originally inspired by the Italian ballet masters of the early Romantic ballet, and literally meaning absolute first ballerina, the title was bestowed on a prima ballerina who was considered to be exceptionally talented, above the standard of other leading ballerinas. The title is very rarely used today and recent uses have typically been symbolic, either in recognition of a prestigious international career, or for exceptional service to a particular ballet company. There is no universal procedure for designating who may receive the title, which has led to dispute in the ballet community over who can legitimately claim it. It is usually a ballet company that bestows the title, however some dancers have had the title officially sanctioned by a government or head of state, sometimes for political rather than artistic reasons. Less common is for a dancer to become identified as a prima ballerina assoluta as a result of public and critical opinion.

History
The first recorded use of the title as a company rank was in 1894, when French ballet master Marius Petipa bestowed it on Italian ballerina Pierina Legnani. He considered her to be the supreme leading ballerina in all of Europe.

The second ballerina to be given the title was Legnani's contemporary Mathilde Kschessinska. Petipa, however, did not agree that she should hold such a title; although an extraordinary ballerina, he felt that she obtained the title primarily via her connections with the Imperial Russian court.

Legnani's heir in the Italian ballet tradition, Attilia Radice trained with Enrico Cecchetti at La Scala in Milan where she became a leading dancer and was later appointed prima ballerina assoluta at Teatro dell'Opera di Roma.

The only Soviet ballerinas to hold the title were Galina Ulanova, Maya Plisetskaya, and Natalia Makarova who defected to the West in 1970. 

The Swiss-born American Eva Evdokimova became recognised as a prima ballerina assoluta following guest appearances with the Kirov Ballet in the 1970s, when she was named as such by the company ballet mistress, Natalia Dudinskaya. The title was later recognised by a vote of the Senate of Berlin.

Other dancers awarded the title include Anneli Alhanko from Sweden, Alicia Alonso from Cuba, Alessandra Ferri from Italy, and Alicia Markova and Margot Fonteyn from England.

The only French dancer to hold the title is Yvette Chauviré.

Though the U.S. has no process for designation of the title, Rudolf Nureyev referred to the American ballerina Cynthia Gregory of the American Ballet Theatre as the nation's prima ballerina assoluta; however this has never been formally acknowledged. Another not to hold the title is Anna Pavlova, one of the best known ballerinas in history. 

In South Africa, the only ballerina granted the title prima ballerina assoluta (1984) was Phyllis Spira (1943–2008).

Honorees

See also
 Glossary of ballet
 Ballet dancer
 List of prima ballerinas
 List of dancers

References

Ballet occupations
 Prima ballerina assoluta